TopNotch is a Dutch record label specializing in hip-hop. The label was founded in 1995, and is run by Vincent Patty. After some commercial success (with rap acts such as De Jeugd van Tegenwoordig, The Opposites, Def Rhymz, Postmen, and Extince) it became allied with Virgin EMI Records, and since 2004 has a marketing and distribution deal with PIAS Entertainment Group. It has expanded into Dutch-language music by singer-songwriters such as Lucky Fonz III, and in 2009 signed a distribution and marketing agreement with Universal Music Group. Still praised in 2009 as "the brand for high-quality Dutch hip-hop", it sought to expand into other musical genres.
Latest artist to leave Top Notch was Ronnie Flex on April 22 2021. 
After a conflict were both parties couldn't agree on a new contract.

History
Founder Kees de Koning is a former music journalist and manager of Anouk. He is credited with "putting Dutch hip-hop on the map" with TopNotch, signing acts such as De Jeugd van Tegenwoordig, Extince, and The Opposites. Initially the label, which released music that didn't automatically receive radio play, used platforms such as YouTube and Hyves to get attention for its artists, and added Instagram and Vine. TopNotch also collaborates in marketing with companies such as the brewery Bavaria and insurance company Centraal Beheer; for the latter, it made a video featuring Anouk, watched over 2 million times by August 2013. After achieving commercial success with Def Rhymz, Postmen, and Extince, the label acquired a reputation such that Virgin EMI Records hired de Koning as A&R and label manager in 2000. Success with Raymzter and Opgezwolle notwithstanding, de Koning's contract was not renewed after four years, and the label was in danger of folding. In 2004, PIAS Entertainment Group signed a distribution and marketing deal with TopNotch, saving the label. The first releases after the restructuring were by VSOP, Duvel Duvel, and Kubus. In 2009, the label make a distribution and marketing agreement with Universal Music Group (owners of Virgin EMI) and signed a non-hip-hop act, gabber punk band Aux Raus.

Their fifteenth anniversary, in 2010, was celebrated with a two-day festival in the Melkweg. That same year the label signed Lucky Fonz III, a Dutch-language singer, in a more comprehensive effort to expand beyond hip-hop which also included signing Surinamese singer Damaru; de Koning had personally pursued the artist, whose monthly performances in the TV show De Wereld Draait Door he admired. Their biggest commercial success to date is Gers Pardoel, whose "Ik neem je mee" is referred to as the most successful Dutch song ever; the song's video had 15 million views by 15 August 2013, a Dutch record.

De Koning started another company in 2006, Good Life, with Jerry Leembruggen and Ruben Fernhout (founders of The Partysquad and owners of the production company F & L Entertainment). Good Life aimed to produce more pop-oriented, rhythm and blues artists (such as Wudstik) through record deals and events.

In 2012, NopTotch started also signing Flemish rappers, the first Flemish rappers who signed were Safi & Spreej. 1 year later, Tourist LeMC also signed in TopNotch short after winning Humo's Rock Rally. Signing these 2 Flemish rappers was the first step to help Flanders grow the Flemish hip-hop culture.

Artists

Current artists
 Appa
 Digitz
 Adje
 Cho
 Damaru
 Dio
 Extince
 Gers Pardoel
 Jack Parow
 Lange Frans
 Lefties Soul Connection
 Lil' Kleine
 Lucky Fonz III
 The Opposites
 Salah Edin
 Typhoon
 U-Niq
 Safi & Spreej
 Tourist LeMC
 SFB
DVDellaahh

Artists produced together with Magnetron Music
 De Jeugd van Tegenwoordig

Former artists
 Ronnie Flex
 Bilal Wahib
 Cilvaringz
 Def Rhymz
 K-Liber
 Kempi
 Opgezwolle
 Postmen
 Raymzter
 Robert Lee

References

Footnotes

Reference footnotes

External links
 Home page (Dutch)

Dutch record labels